Baitul Mukhlisin Islamic Center Mosque is a mosque located in Liwa, West Lampung Regency, Lampung, Indonesia. The mosque is constructed in 2009 and finished in 2010. It is known as Bintang Emas (Gold Star) Mosque as the star on top of the dome is coated in gold color. Most of the buildings use architecture with Arabic ornaments. Building materials are selected from Lampung and andesite marble stones that enhance space and minimize maintenance costs.

See also 
 Islam in Indonesia
 List of mosques in Indonesia

Further reading 
 

West Lampung Regency
Buildings and structures in Lampung
Mosques in Indonesia
Mosques completed in 2010